The William Bate Hardy Prize is awarded by the Cambridge Philosophical Society. It is awarded once in three years “for the best original memoir, investigation or discovery by a member of the University of Cambridge in connection with Biological Science that may have been published during the three years immediately preceding”.

Recipients
(incomplete list-prize awarded at least 22 times by 2014)
1966 Hugh Huxley (inaugural winner)
1969 Sydney Brenner and Ralph Riley
1976 Frederick Sanger
1978 Richard Henderson
1981 César Milstein
1984 John Gurdon
1987 Michael Berridge
1991 Azim Surani
1993 Martin Evans
1995 Nicholas Barry Davies
1998 Tim Clutton-Brock and Andrew Wyllie (shared)
2001 Michael Neuberger and James Cuthbert Smith (shared)
2004 Andrea Brand and Robin Irvine (shared)
2010 Beverley Glover, Dr Peter Forster and Simon Conway Morris  (shared)
2014 Serena Nik-Zainal

See also

 List of biology awards

External links
Charter, Abstracts of Laws Prescribed by Charter, Bye Laws, Regulations from the William Hopkins Prize and the William Bate Hardy Prize

References

Biology awards
Biology in the United Kingdom
British science and technology awards